Luis Lopez-Fitzgerald is a fictional character on the NBC/DirecTV soap opera Passions, portrayed from 1999 to 2008 by original cast member Galen Gering.  Debuting in the series' premiere episode, Luis is introduced as an honest, hard-working Irish-Mexican police officer who bitterly blames the wealthy Crane family for his father and elder brother's disappearances. Luis is forced to re-examine his prejudice against the Cranes, however, when he falls in love with the beautiful but willful Sheridan Crane.

Luis and Sheridan's love-hate relationship made the pairing one of the soap's leading supercouples, along with Ethan Winthrop and Theresa Lopez-Fitzgerald, early in its run.  However, after two failed weddings and the birth of a son, who is subsequently kidnapped by Luis's ex-girlfriend, Luis and Sheridan end their relationship in July 2005.  Following the break-up, Luis eventually finds love with Sheridan's niece, Fancy Crane, though their relationship is threatened by Sheridan and Pretty's jealous desire to have Luis for themselves.  After Pretty is revealed to be suffering from a serious mental illness and Sheridan reunites with her presumed-deceased first husband, Luis's older brother Antonio, Luis and Fancy marry in July 2008, and Fancy reveals that they are expecting their first baby together in the series finale.

Character history

Early life
Luis Lopez-Fitzgerald was born in Harmony, New England, in the early or mid-1970s to Martin Fitzgerald, an Irish-American employee at Crane Industries, and Pilar Lopez-Fitzgerald, a Mexican immigrant and housekeeper at the Crane mansion.  Luis was the second of five children born to the working-class couple — Antonio Brian Lopez-Fitzgerald is about one to three years his senior, while younger siblings Theresa, Miguel, and Paloma Lopez-Fitzgerald are all approximately a decade his junior.  Though never wealthy, the Lopez-Fitzgerald brood were a loving, tight-knit family, contrasting the rich but cold Crane family.  Pilar raised her children to be proud of their Hispanic heritage, instilling in them her devout Roman Catholic faith, cooking them traditional Mexican dishes, and teaching them Latin dances.

Shortly after the birth of Luis's youngest sister, Paloma, Martin disappeared, leaving Pilar emotionally devastated and struggling to care for five young children on her own.  Eventually, she chose to send baby Paloma to live in Mexico with her sister, Maria, and Antonio took on the roles of the man of the house and paternal figure to his younger brothers and sister.  Despite his father's absence, Luis continued to flourish; in high school, his excellence in academics and sports made him a popular and well-liked student.  Luis dated Beth Wallace during this time, and though the two were deeply in love, Luis feared that he would leave Beth like his father had left his mother and broke up with her.

After graduating from high school, Luis had hopes of attending law school and becoming a lawyer.  However, Antonio, too, disappeared shortly after Luis's graduation, and Luis was forced to join the Harmony Police Department and take up the man-of-the-house role that Antonio had abandoned.  His unexpected responsibilities embittered Luis, and he came to hate the Cranes for the poor wages they offered his mother, their head housekeeper and Ivy Crane's close confidante, and blame them for his father and brother's disappearances.

Relationship with Sheridan

Initial dislike, 1999–2000

Luis and Sheridan first meet in mid-1999 when Luis pulls Sheridan over for speeding upon her return from Paris.  Sheridan is haughty, believing that her status as a Crane will persuade Luis to take a bribe.  Luis, however, sees Sheridan as just another Crane believing herself to be above the law and places her in jail, seeking to have her punished to the fullest extent of the law.  Sheridan tries to fight the ticket in court, but she loses and is sentenced to six months of community service at the local children's center, of which Luis is head.  Sheridan's attempts to bribe her way out of community service are thus dashed; though Luis dislikes spending time with her, he wants her to pay for her crime.

Though Luis and Sheridan's chemistry quickly became obvious to onlookers, the two remained oblivious and reveled in their dislike for one another.  While working at the community center, Sheridan began dating Luis's best friend, Hank Bennett, unaware that Hank had become entangled with the French drug cartel.  As a result of her relationship with Hank, several of the cartel's hitmen began to target Sheridan.  The FBI appointed Luis as Sheridan's private bodyguard, and though both objected to the arrangement, Luis eventually decided to put his job ahead of his personal feelings.  Sheridan was unable to do the same, however, and frequently placed herself in dangerous situations while trying to distance herself from Luis.

Just as Luis and Sheridan finally reconcile their feelings for one another, Sheridan is apparently assassinated by one of the cartel's hitmen.  Luis is devastated by Sheridan's death, but is overjoyed when, at Christmastime, he discovers that the FBI faked Sheridan's death to thwart her would-be assassins.  Free to be together, Luis and Sheridan become engaged.

Engagement and Sheridan's apparent death, 2001-2002
Though Luis and Sheridan are happily in love, Sheridan's father, Alistair, disapproves of their relationship; Alistair fears that Luis will use his position as Sheridan's husband to uncover some of his nefarious business dealings and forbids Sheridan from seeing Luis. Luis and Sheridan defy him, however, and Alistair hires an actor, whom he fits with a mask of Luis's face, to trick Sheridan into believing that Luis is using her only for her money. The pair eventually catch the double but are unable to prove whether Alistair or Sheridan's brother, Julian, had been behind the plot.

Unable to separate the couple, Alistair resorts to murder and laces Sheridan's wedding ring with a quick-acting poison that will be activated by her DNA. The summer 2001 ceremony is a double wedding with Sheridan's step-nephew, Ethan Winthrop, and Luis's younger sister, Theresa Lopez-Fitzgerald, however, and Ethan's mother crashes her car into the church, believing that Theresa had revealed his paternity to the tabloids; the wedding is ruined, and Sheridan never puts on her ring. Luis and Sheridan decide to reset their wedding date, but go to their honeymoon in Bermuda anyway.

Determined to end the couple's relationship, Alistair rigs Luis and Sheridan's rented boat with TNT. The boat explodes, and Sheridan's body is later recovered and cremated, leaving Luis devastated.  As he grieves, Luis is comforted by his ex-girlfriend, Beth, who is still in love with Luis even though their high school relationship ended several years earlier. The two eventually become engaged, though Luis still pines for Sheridan.

Sheridan's return and marriage to Antonio, 2002–04
Luis discovers that Sheridan is still alive when she returns to Harmony in July 2002 with his once-missing brother, Antonio. After the boat explosion, Antonio, a fisherman living under the name of Brian O'Leary, had rescued Sheridan from the Atlantic Ocean and taken her back to the island of St. Lisa's, where Sheridan had awoken with amnesia and had subsequently become engaged to Antonio. Though Luis is quick to break things off with Beth, Sheridan is reluctant to do so with Antonio; Antonio is slowly dying, and any shock is said to be possibly fatal.

Sheridan remains engaged to Antonio, and Luis reunites with Beth, though Luis and Sheridan carry on a clandestine affair with one another. The couples eventually plan to be married in another double ceremony, and Luis and Sheridan, unable to be without one another, decide to secretly marry at the courthouse. The two miss each other, though, and each believes that the other had gotten cold feet. As a result, Antonio and Sheridan are married on January 9, 2003; before Luis and Beth can be married, Beth's mother, Edna Wallace, suffers a heart attack, and the two call off their engagement.

Sheridan eventually finds herself pregnant and unsure as to whether or not Antonio or Luis has fathered her child. When Beth hears of Sheridan's pregnancy, she drugs Luis and makes him believe that he's slept with her, later claiming that she's become pregnant as a result. Afraid that the baby will unite Sheridan and Luis, Beth kidnaps Sheridan and holds her captive in a pit in her basement until Sheridan gives birth to a son on September 9, 2003. Beth then dumps Sheridan in the harbor and fakes the baby's death so that she can pass the child off as her own. The ruse works, and Luis believes that the boy, whom Beth names Martin Lopez-Fitzgerald, is theirs.

Sheridan feels such a strong connection to Marty, however, that she comes to believe him to be her own son; as a result of her claims, she is placed into a psychiatric ward, where Alistair has her brainwashed into believing that she is in love with Antonio and not Luis. Luis is unable to accept Sheridan's new personality and continually hounds his sister-in-law, eventually leading Antonio and Sheridan to decide to leave town. Just as they are about to leave Harmony, though, Sheridan remembers her love for Luis and leaves Antonio, who decides to leave town anyway. Alistair, believing that Sheridan is on the Crane jet with Antonio, has the airplane blown up, supposedly killing Antonio on June 24, 2004, and making Sheridan a widow. Because Antonio's body is never recovered, though, Sheridan must to go through the lengthy process of having Antonio declared legally dead, and Luis and Sheridan are unable to immediately marry.

Second chance and Marty's maternity, 2004–05
When Pilar is diagnosed with a fatal blood disorder, Luis and Sheridan fly to Puerto Arena, Mexico, to retrieve Luis's youngest sister, Paloma, and bring her back to Harmony to comfort their mother after Antonio's death. There, Luis and Sheridan meet Bob and Ellen Wheeler, who have helped Luis and Paloma's aunt Maria raise Paloma. Paloma is initially unwilling to return to Harmony and only agrees to leave Mexico on the condition that the Wheelers return with her.

Once back in Harmony, Luis eventually discovers that Bob Wheeler is none other than his father, Martin Fitzgerald. Luis is furious with his father for abandoning their family and demands an explanation, but Martin refuses. Martin's reason becomes apparent at Luis and Sheridan's second, and ultimately failed, wedding ceremony in December 2004, when Ellen Wheeler is revealed to be Sheridan's late mother, Katherine Crane. Martin, seeing the abuse that Katherine had suffered as Alistair's wife, helped her to escape her abusive husband, only to realize that he would be killed if he returned to Harmony; the two then became lovers in Mexico. Sheridan is thrilled to have her mother back and wants to bond with her, but Luis objects, furious at Katherine for tearing his family apart.

Sheridan, meanwhile, begins again her claims that Marty is her son and not Beth's. A DNA test is eventually performed, and the results come back showing Beth, not Sheridan, to be Marty's mother. Despite the results, Sheridan continues to claim Marty as her own, but Luis, faced with DNA evidence, sides with Beth. Eventually, it is discovered that Alistair had fathered Beth, making Sheridan and Beth half-sisters — the DNA test had only examined Beth for kinship, not for maternity. Luis and Sheridan set off to reclaim Marty, but Beth flees with the boy; when they catch her at a cabin in the mountains, Luis is unable to shoot her, allowing Beth to escape the country with Marty. Sheridan is furious with Luis for his inability to believe her and ends their relationship.  Luis is wracked with guilt and leaves Harmony to search for Marty; at the time, actor Galen Gering and NBC had become engaged in a contract dispute that had nearly caused Gering to leave Passions. Although he eventually re-signed, the writers had been forced to plan for Gering's possible exit and wrote Luis out of the scripts for over seven months. As a result, Luis makes only brief phone appearances in August 2005 before Sheridan and the Lopez-Fitzgeralds are told that Luis has been murdered in Tangier in October.

Search for Marty, 2005–06
Luis does not resurface until March 2006 when Sheridan and Chris Boothe rescue him from a Crane compound in Hawaii that they've believed to house Marty; Alistair had abducted Luis and faked his death.  Luis is thrilled to be reunited with Sheridan, and the two are quickly married on March 27.  Luis is overjoyed to be free of his prison and reunited with his family, but he is devastated when he learns on April 13 that his marriage to Sheridan is invalid — Sheridan married Chris on February 22.  Luis tries to convince Sheridan to leave Chris, but she refuses, explaining that she has become a mother to Chris's young son, James, and is expecting Chris's child.  Believing that Sheridan will be forced to leave Chris if he finds Marty, Luis sets off for Rome, where he believes Beth and Marty to be hiding.

In Rome, Luis searches for Marty alongside an unexpected companion - Sheridan's niece, celebutante Fancy Crane. The two become good friends, bonding over their respective relationship woes with Sheridan and Noah Bennett. Luis and Fancy eventually discover that Alistair, who fell into a coma early in the year, is well and plotting to become omnipotent. Luis and Fancy, along with several others, foil Alistair's plot and set out to capture him, Beth, and Marty.  Luis, Fancy, and Noah are close to capturing Alistair when a drone airplane appears and fired missiles at a bridge, causing the train that Alistair, Beth, and Marty are traveling in to fall into a ravine and kill them on July 17, 2006. Luis is devastated by his son's death and broken by the fact that he will never be able to win Sheridan back. His guilt is further intensified when Sheridan suffers a miscarriage after learning of Marty's death, and Luis makes plans to leave Harmony.

Relationship with Fancy

Development, 2006
Upon returning to Harmony, Fancy realizes that she has feelings for Luis and, with her aunt's blessing, begins to actively pursue a relationship with him.  In furtherance of this goal, she joins the police cadet training program, which is headed by Luis.  Luis is annoyed by Fancy's participation, believing that she isn't serious about joining the police force.  However, Fancy comes to love police work, and Luis comes to respect her as a cadet.  The two become attracted to one another, but, due to police academy rules, are unable to date until she is graduated.

Luis's budding feelings for Fancy are complicated by his lingering love for Sheridan, however.  Though she is committed to her marriage, Sheridan has trouble seeing Luis move on, often giving him false hope for their future.  Luis finally realizes that he is in love with Fancy, however, when she goes missing in November after pursuing the man that James identified as Chris's shooter and Phyllis's murderer.  Sheridan is disturbed by the fervor with which Luis searches for Fancy and drugs his tea; while asleep, however, Luis and Fancy's souls are able to connect, and he realizes that she is in an abandoned mine shaft.  As she lie ill from internal injuries and hypothermia, Luis professes his love for her, telling her that "I think you're saving [my life]".

Blackmailer storyline, 2006–07
When she returns to work, Fancy is as determined as ever to prove herself to Luis, her superior, and switches places with another officer, taking part in a sting to catch a peeping tom.  The operation fails, however, and Fancy is brutally raped before Luis can arrive and save her.  Physically and emotionally traumatized, Fancy falls into a coma, devastating Luis, who stays by her side at Christmas.  Fancy awakens in time for the holidays, the Christmas miracle of 2006, but the attack devastates her; Luis, aching for Fancy and furious with her rapist, vows to apprehend her assailant.

Upon returning home, Fancy suffers from terrifying nightmares and becomes convinced that her rapist has returned.  In one struggle, she rips one of his buttons from his shirt and drops it to the floor, but Sheridan, by this time consumed by a jealous fury toward the depth of Luis's love for her niece, finds and hides the button and convinces Luis that posttraumatic stress, along with an abuse of alcohol and sedatives, have led Fancy to imagine her attacks, also insinuating that Fancy may have made up the assaults for attention.  Fancy is furious at her aunt and confesses to Luis that she overheard one of Sheridan's jealous tirades while comatose, but Luis is unable to believe that his former lover has changed so radically.

When Luis finds Fancy asleep with sliced sheets, he realizes that her attacker has indeed returned. Luis takes Fancy to her "princess room", where he intends to sleep on her couch and protect her during the night. Fancy's attacker injects Luis with a drug, however, which causes him to hallucinate that he is making love to Fancy while the attacker undresses Luis exposing his Torso and genital area as well as pulling out a condom and rapes him by manually milking his genitalia and spermjacks his semen collected into the condom. After dragging Luis away, the attacker then rapes Fancy for a second time, during which time he inseminates her with Luis's stolen semen. Chad and Whitney hear Fancy screaming and find her alone but bruised, and when they search the mansion for her attacker, they find Luis, unconscious and dressed as Fancy's assailant, in the kitchen pantry.

At the hospital, doctors perform a rape kit on Fancy and find Luis's semen. Because Luis and Fancy admitted earlier that they have not consummated their relationship, Luis is arrested for Fancy's rape and then released on bail.  The two believe that they have found proof of Luis's innocence when Rae Thomas claims to have information about Fancy's attacker, but the attacker murders Rae and frames Luis, who is arrested and held in jail.

Luis awakens in his cell one night to find his door open and his clothing reeking of gasoline; fearing that he is about to be set up for something, he heads off to the home of Dylan Flood, a Blue Note bartender to whom Rae had left some information about Fancy's rapist.  By the time Luis arrives, however, Dylan is dead, and the attacker has set fire to the apartment.  Harmony Police are called to the scene, and they see Luis inside and believe him to be the arsonist.  When a box of ammunition explodes in the heat, Fancy, unaware that the apparent arsonist is Luis, returns fire and shoots Luis.  Though Luis makes a full recovery, he is charged with arson and an additional count of murder.

Due to the Blackmailer's machinations, Luis is tried jointly with his brother, Miguel, despite the fact that Miguel's charge of striking Fox Crane with his car is unrelated.  Fancy provides Luis with helpful testimony on the stand, but a jealous Sheridan destroys her niece's credibility while simultaneously admitting that she still wants Luis for herself.  Luis is convicted on all five counts and becomes furious with Sheridan for her antics.

Luis, hoping to spare Fancy the pain of seeing him in prison, removes her name from the visitors list.  Fancy is determined to be with Luis, however, and disguises herself as a quasi-lesbian prison guard, thus allowing her to both see and protect Luis from the prison's violent guards.  The two are about to have sex in the prison infirmary when Sheridan sees a live feed on Fancy's laptop of the two and calls the warden.  Fancy is ejected from the prison, and Judge Reilly orders that Luis be executed as soon as possible.

Though only able to see Luis as a visitor, Fancy is able to bribe her way into the prison late in June, when she and Luis finally consummate their relationship.  Luis's time is quickly running out, however, and the Blackmailer continues to elude all who seek him.  By late July, all of Luis's appeals have been denied and his execution is imminent.  Desperate to savor their remaining time together, Fancy proposes to Luis, and he accepts.  They are set to be married in early August, but Fancy's younger sister, Pretty, returns to Harmony just as Fancy is prepared to walk down the aisle in a double wedding with Noah and Paloma.  Pretty blames her sister for an accident that left Pretty permanently disfigured on the right side of her face, and she threatens to tell Luis about what Fancy did.  Earlier, Pilar had begged Fancy to let Luis die believing in his "angel", so Fancy cancels the nuptials.

Luis is executed on August 6, but Endora Lenox, saddened by her half-sister's loss, turns back time inside the execution chamber so that Eve Russell can confess that her long-lost son with Julian, Vincent Clarkson, is the mysterious blackmailer who murdered Rae and Dylan, set fire to Dylan's apartment, and twice raped Fancy, his own half-sister.  Vincent is arrested, and Luis is freed, much to the joy of Fancy and his family.

Complications and resolution, 2007–08
Shortly after his release from prison, Pretty tells Luis that Fancy threw pool chemicals in her face in a purposeful attempt to scar her. Luis doesn't believe Pretty until Fancy confirms the story, though she denies that the attack is intentional. Fancy tries to break up with Luis, afraid that the so-called "Crane curse" will cause her to harm Luis, but Luis convinces her that such fears are unsubstantiated, and they continue their relationship.

Their relationship quickly becomes complicated, however, when Sheridan presents Luis proof that Marty, now aged to seven years, is still alive. Sheridan, hoping to drive a wedge between Luis and Fancy, forbids Luis from telling Fancy about Marty under the guise of preventing Alistair from discovering what they know. Luis's secretive behavior and magic-induced trysts with Sheridan, coupled with Fancy's random and violent outbursts caused by the mind control chip that Alistair implanted in her brain, creates so much strain on their relationship that Fancy breaks things off.

Although miserable without Fancy, Luis is determined to find Marty; when he receives word that he will have to give up his life in order to get Marty back, he goes to a basement and prepares to do so. However, all he finds there is Fancy's younger sister Pretty, who is working with Alistair to break up Luis and Fancy. Alistair tells Luis that he will have to impregnate Pretty in order to gain their freedom, which he reluctantly does, despite the fact that Pretty is a virgin. Fancy and Sheridan eventually find Luis and Pretty, and Fancy is horrified by Luis's actions.

On Christmas Eve, in a last-ditch attempt to recover her daughter, Tabitha Lenox performs good magic on Luis and Fancy, on whom she previously cast spells to make them have sex with Sheridan and Noah, respectively, allowing Fancy to overcome her reservations and reunite with Luis. Luis also receives a second miracle that night; Alistair returns Marty to Sheridan's cottage. Luis is thrilled to be reunited with his son, and looks forward to becoming a family with Fancy and Marty.

Pretty, however, falls in love with Luis after their tryst and seeks to destroy her sister and win Luis. Using Alistair's mind-control device, she forces Fancy to lash out at Luis and Sheridan and to scare young Marty, infuriating Luis. Still, Luis is determined to understand what is wrong with Fancy and refuses to give up on her, even after finding her kissing Noah on the wharf. Eventually, Luis comes to realize that something is desperately wrong with Fancy when she begins running into walls and barking like a dog on the wharf, and when she stops breathing, it is his declaration of love that brings her back. Pretty plans to have Fancy murder Paloma, but Sheridan, discovers Pretty's plot, and throws the mind-control remote into the ocean, causing the device in Fancy's nose to short-circuit and fall out. With her free will returned to her, Luis and Fancy are able to reunite once more, which also leads to a reconciliation with Sheridan.

After reuniting, Fancy begins thinking about having a baby with Luis. Although she is eager to become pregnant immediately, Luis is hesitant, preferring to fully recover from the past few months' drama before fathering a second child; Fancy understands but privately fears that Luis believes that her violent mood swings will return. During this time, Pretty decided to fake a pregnancy to rip her sister's relationship apart. Fancy is devastated by the news, fearing that her relationship will be torn apart by Luis's families with her sister and aunt, but Luis vows that Fancy is the only one for him, proposing to her on April 30. Fancy and Luis eventually discover Pretty's treachery, and after Pretty tries to scar Fancy's face with acid, Sheridan reveals that Pretty's scar has been fake all along. Luis and Fancy quickly realize that the youngest Crane child is mentally unwell, and Pretty is sent to a mental institution. The couple are deeply upset by Pretty's plight, but are also happy to be free of her machinations, and begin planning for their imminent wedding. Fancy and Luis are married on July 23, and Fancy tells Luis that they are expecting a baby in the series finale.

See also
Lopez-Fitzgerald family
Crane family

References and footnotes

External links
PASSIONS CAST - LUIS LOPEZ-FITZGERALD at Soaps.com
Who's Who in Harmony: Luis Lopez-Fitzgerald at Soap Central
Luis Lopez-Fitzgerald Cast Bio at NBC
Soap Star Stats: Galen Gering at Soap Opera Digest

Passions characters
Fictional bodyguards
Male characters in television
Fictional American police detectives
Television characters introduced in 1999